Blessing of the Bay was the second oceangoing, non-fishing vessel built in what is now the United States, preceded only by the Virginia, in 1607.

Construction
The Blessing of the Bay was a thirty-ton barque or a pinnace, built largely of locust tree wood. According to John R. Spears, Blessing of the Bay was not a bark except as the term was used to designate any sailing vessel at the time. He also stated that she had one mast.  William H. Clark calls the Blessing of the Bay "primarily a trading vessel, but armed and designed to fight." He also stated, "she was high-bowed with one mast."

The ship was built for John Winthrop at Mistick (now Medford, Massachusetts), by Robert Molton and other shipwrights sent to New England in 1629 by the Massachusetts Bay Company, and was launched July 4, 1631 under the command of Anthony Dike.

Coastal voyages to New Amsterdam
Blessing of the Bay was built "for the use of the Massachusetts Colony at the insistence of Governor Winthrop, and was finished under his eye, the object being to open communication with the Dutch at the mouth of the Hudson and to trade to various parts of the coast." 

She went to sea August 31, 1631, and carried on a coastal trade as far south as the Dutch settlement of New Amsterdam (New York City). "She traded regularly along the entire New England coast and around Cape Cod and Long Island and with the Dutch on Manhattan Island. She carried to the Dutch salt from sea water, maple sugar, and probably clapboards, in exchange for molasses, sugar from the West Indies, and the spices and tea that the Dutch ships brought from the East via Amsterdam." Hall says that she sailed to "Long Island and other settled localities."

On November 21, 1632, according to Perley's History of Salem, Governor Winthrop called a council with Captain Neal of Portsmouth, New Hampshire to use a bark ship described similarly as the Blessing of the Bay to apprehend the pirate Dixie Bull, but unfavorable weather conditions prevented their pursuit:

Loss of the ship
According to Hall, Blessing of the Bay traded for only a short time. She "disappeared from view, and it is possible that she was the unfortunate vessel sent by Winthrop and others from Boston to Virginia in 1633 with a load of fish and furs and was wrecked on the capes when near her destination."

In Bertha Clark’s genealogical research Bertha Clark found the following information on the bark Blessing of the Bay. (John Wood of Rhode Island and His Early Descendants on the Mainland by Bertha W. Clark, and edited by Dorothy W. Ewers:   1966}

"1636

     In the spring of 1636 John Winthrop, Jr. wrote to his father in Boston from Saybrook. to which he was newly and not yet permanently come: “Quineticut May 16:1636 Sir, John Wood being returned with out any Corne I shall -now desire that I may be supplied by the first shipping that arrive with any store of provisions with 10, or 13 hogsh[eads] of meale 5 or 6 hogsh[eads] of peas 2 or 3 barrells of oatmeale 2 hogsh[eads] of beife.  for if we should want I see noe meanes to be supplied heere, and a little want may overthrow all our designs.

     “I sent home the Bacheler, and desire your helpe for her disposing.  I must of necessity have her returne heere for I may shortly have much use of her: but I desire they may goe for shares and victual them selves, which John Wood and his company are willing to doe.  I cannot find that the miscarriage of his voyage was through his default but Contrary winds therefore I am desirous he should and that Company goe still is her, so they will goe for shares and victual themselves.  the Blessing I would sell if any will buy her at 160 or 150 £  she Cost 145 besides some new saile, and rigging and a new Cable above 20 £.  the Cable is special; good, except you should foresee any occasion that she should rather be kept still: or if their be implyment to Sable for her: but if she continues to goe upon and designe I desire she should goe likewise for her share the men to find themselves, otherwise I would have her laid up at Boston till further occasion.  the men I desire should be discharged as soone as ever they Come ashore, and their wages paid them: I thanke you for the bread you sent.  you write of 800 but there is not above 300 and an halfe at most delivered, besides 100 they keepe still aboard the rest I cannot learne what become of it but that it hath been wastefully spent:  they had besides halfe an hogshead of bread of their owne which was likewise spent and they were but [mutilated] eleven persons they say most of that tyme.  [mutilated] for they pillaged her the tyme they had her to Salem pittifully that she hath neyther blockes nor braces nor running ropes, which the Bolt Will sayth teat Mr. Holgrave cutt them of he saw him.  therefore I have agreed with John Wood Fredericke and George to take her to thirds.  thus with my duty remembred I rest your obedient son.

                                                                                               John Winthrop”     6

     The George just mentioned was John Wood’s son.  At the settlement of Wood’s estate nineteen years later George was called his eldest son.  If – as seems likely – Frederick was another son, he must have predeceased his father, for he is not mentioned in the settlement.  This is the only reference to him that we have seen.

     It is evident from the letter that Winthrop placed confidence in John Wood and his group, even though they had ill luck on a recent voyage for him.  He is considering putting both the Bachelor and the Blessing under their management, and has made some sort of tentative agreement with them about it; of which, however, his Papers give us no further details.

     The Blessing was a boat that had already helped make American history.  Hubbard in his “New England” says: “The bark Blessing, built by Gov. Winthrop at Mistick in 1631 returned Oct. 2, 1634 from a voyage southward to the Dutch Plantation upon Hudson’s river having made a further discovery of that [land] called Long-Island.” 7  .  It is even possible – very possible—that John Wood was on that voyage, and that it was then that he made the acquaintance of Manhattan.  He was surely in that town, and investing money in I, by 1640."

References
6   Winthrop Papers 3:260 

       7   Hubbard:  Hist. of N. Eng. (1848 ed.) p. 171 
 

Barques
Age of Sail merchant ships of the United States
Age of Sail merchant ships of England
Pre-statehood history of Massachusetts
Ships built in Medford, Massachusetts
Missing ships
1630s ships